Pradelle or Pradelles is the name or part of the name of the following communes in France:

 Pradelle, Drôme, in the Drôme department
 Pradelles, Haute-Loire, in the Haute-Loire department
 Pradelles, Nord, in the Nord department
 Pradelles-Cabardès, in the Aude department
 Pradelles-en-Val, in the Aude department